Libor Rouček (born 4 September 1954 in Kladno)
is a Czech politician and
Member of the European Parliament with the Czech Social Democratic Party,
part of the Socialist Group and sits on
the European Parliament's Committee on Foreign Affairs.

He is a substitute for the Committee on Budgets and a member of the
Delegation for relations with Iran.

Education
 1984: Doctor of Philosophy (University of Vienna)

Career
 1988-1991: Editor
 1991-1992: Research fellow
 1993-1997: Market research specialist
 1998-2002: Government spokesman
 2002-2004: Member of the Chamber of Deputies of the Parliament of the Czech Republic
 2002-2004: Vice-Chairman of the Committee for European Integration
 2002-2004: Vice-Chairman of the Committee for Foreign Affairs
 2003-2004: Head of the ČSSD observers' delegation to the European Parliament
 2003-2004: Vice-Chairman of the ČSSD Club of Deputies
 since 2003: Vice-Chairman of ČSSD (Czech Social Democratic Party) for the Central Bohemian Region

See also
2004 European Parliament election in the Czech Republic

External links

 
 

1954 births
Living people
Politicians from Kladno
Czech Social Democratic Party MEPs
MEPs for the Czech Republic 2004–2009
MEPs for the Czech Republic 2009–2014
University of Vienna alumni